Pál Bornemissza was the Roman Catholic bishop of Transylvania in the Kingdom of Hungary from 1553 and 1556. King Ferdinand I appointed him to the episcopal see after years of vacancy, although the Transylvanian nobles had proposed an other candidate, Márton Kecseti. Bornemissza could not stop the spread of Reformation in his diocese and he left Transylvania in 1554. Two years later, he abdicated the bishopric. After his abdication, the Transylvanian bishopric was left vacant for more than 100 years.

References

Sources 

16th-century Roman Catholic bishops in Hungary
Bishops of Transylvania